René Marcelo Ortubé Betancourt (born December 26, 1964 in La Paz) is a Bolivian former football referee, best known for supervising one match (Sweden-Nigeria in Kobe) during the 2002 FIFA World Cup. He is now director of sports institutes and services in Bolivian capital La Paz.

References
 Profile

1964 births
Sportspeople from La Paz
Football in La Paz
Bolivian football referees
FIFA World Cup referees
Living people
Copa América referees
Place of birth missing (living people)
2002 FIFA World Cup referees